Gwangju International Film Festival is an international film festival that takes place in Gwangju, South Korea. The festival was first held from 
12/7/2001 to 12/14/2001 at Gwangju Theater, Mudeung Theater, Jaeil Cinema, and Cine City. The festival was held annually in various venues within the city until it was indefinitely postponed in 2016. It was originally a non-competitive film festival and it was partially converted into a competitive film festival in 2002. The main focus of the festival is to introduce movies that are critically acclaimed but have not been introduced to South Korea and to lay a cultural groundwork by grafting the cultural heritage of Jeollanam-Do together with movie as a new cultural code. It also intends to bring awareness to important historical events such as Gwangju Uprising through films.

From 2001 to 2015, the festival has experienced multiple issues including lack of audiences, technological issues regarding the sound system, and movies being cancelled. The festival was eventually indefinitely postponed in 2016 when an internal conflict within the organizing committee occurred between the chairman and the executive director. The conflict occurred in regards to the settlement of revenue from previous year's film festival and this has threatened the funding of the festival, which caused the festival to be indefinitely postponed 2 months prior to the opening. 500 films from 25 countries in Europe and Asia were received by the organizing committee before it was postponed. Currently, as of 2023, the festival remains postponed.

History 

 1st Gwangju International Film Festival, 2001.12.7 ~ 2001.12.14

 Films screened: 140 films from 26 countries
 Opening Film: L'Emploi du temps, Laurent Cantet, France
 Closing Film: This is Law, Byeongjin Min, South Korea

 2nd Gwangju International Film Festival, 2002.10.25 ~ 2002.10.31

 Films screened: 203 films from 30 countries
 Opening Film: Unborn but Forgotten, Im Chang-jae, South Korea
 Closing Film: Welcome to Collinwood, Anthony and Joe Russo, US

 3rd Gwangju International Film Festival, 2003.8.22 ~ 2003.8.31

 Films screened: 212 films from 31 countries
 Opening Film: Spring, Summer, Fall, Winter...and Spring
 Closing Film: That Day

 4th Gwangju International Film Festival, 2004.9.2 ~ 2004.9.11

 Films screened: 120 films from 23 countries
 Opening Film: Loved Gun
 Closing Film: Road

 5th Gwangju International Film Festival, 2005.08.26 ~ 2005.09.04

 Films screened: 180 films from 33 countries
 Opening Film: Hands In The Hair
 Closing Film: A Stranger Of Mine

 6th Gwangju International Film Festival, 2006.12.14 ~ 2006.12.18

 Films screened: 49 films from 13 countries
 Opening Film: A Long Walk
 Closing Film: Junebug

 7th Gwangju International Film Festival, 2007.11.28 ~ 2007.12.3

 Films screened: 40 films
 Opening Film: Western Trunk Line
 Closing Film: Los Borgia

 8th Gwangju International Film Festival, 2008.12.4 ~ 2008.12.8

 Films screened: 40 films
 Opening Film: Thick As Thieves
 Closing Film: Vitus

 9th Gwangju International Film Festival, 2009.09.16 ~ 2009.09.20

 Films screened: 50 films from 10 countries
 Opening Film: Penguins In The Sky - Asahiyama Zoo
 Closing Film: The Piano Forest

 10th Gwangju International Film Festival, 2010.12.09 ~ 2010.12.12

 Films screened: 40 films
 Opening Film: O' Horten
 Closing Film: Chef's Special

 11th Gwangju International Film Festival, 2011.10.27 ~ 2011.10.31

 Films screened: 60 films
 Opening Film: People Mountain People Sea
 Closing Film: Offside

 12th Gwangju International Film Festival, 2012.11.08 ~ 2012.11.12

 Films screened: 60 films
 Opening Film: Leona Calderon
 Closing Film: Aung San Suu Kyi, lady of no fear

 13th Gwangju International Film Festival, 2013.08.29 ~ 2013.09.02

 Films screened: 91 films from 24 countries
 Opening Film: Sweet Heart Chocolate
 Closing Film: Stable Life

 14th Gwangju International Film Festival, 2014.08.28 ~ 2014.09.01

 Films screened: 92 films from 25 countries
 Opening Film: Late Spring
 Closing Film: WEST

 15th Gwangju International Film Festival, 2015.05.14 ~ 2015.05.18

 Films screened: 103 films from 31 countries
 Opening Film: Test
 Closing Film: Flying Home

Awards 
Kim Daejung Nobel Peace Film Award

Excellent Asia-Pacific Young Director Award

Audience Award

See also
List of festivals in South Korea
List of festivals in Asia
Culture of South Korea

References

External links
 Gwangju International Film Festival

Film festivals in South Korea
Annual events in South Korea